Kaimei Maru was a Japanese troop transport ship operated by the Imperial Japanese Army during World War II which was sunk off Honshu on 4 September 1942 by the American submarine . The ship was a British WWI Type B military cargo ship built by the Hong Kong and Whampoa Dock Company.

Construction and commissioning 

Kaimei Maru, then known as British ship War Bomber was ordered by London's Shipping Controller and was built at the Hong Kong and Whampoa Dock. It was launched in Hong Kong on 1 August 1919 from Yard No. 563. War Bomber was configured as a British WWI Type B Standard cargo ship although its specifications were larger in scale than standard for ships of this class. War Bomber displaced 5,226 tons with a record deadweight tonnage of 8,000 tons. The launch was attended by Sir Catchick Paul Chater, then Director of the Hong Kong and Whampoa Dock Company and by Sir Claud Severn, the acting Governor of Hong Kong. Later in October 1919, the Hong Kong and Whampoa Dock Company would also launch War Bombers sister ship, War Trooper.

Belgian service 

During the vessel's tenure as a Belgian ship, she was called Pioneer. Pioneer continued her Belgian service for another decade before being sold to Panamanian shipowner Agencia Maritima Carmar in 1939 where she was renamed as Carmar.

Panamanian service 

In 1939, Kaimei Maru, then known as Carmar, was purchased by the Agencia Maritima Carmar Ltda. of Panama. In 1941, Carmar was sold to Kaiyo Kisen K. K. of Kobe, Japan.

Japanese service 

On 13 November 1941, Kaimei Maru was requisitioned by the Imperial Japanese Army for service as a troop transport.

Invasion of the Philippines 

Kaimei Maru was assigned to Army group 262, which supported the 14th Army troops, comprising elements of the 16th Division and 48th Division taking part in the Invasion of the Philippines. During the invasion, Kaimei Maru was one of around 20 Japanese army transports ferrying roughly 7,000 troops under the command of Count Hisaichi Terauchi, Lt. General Masaharu Homma and Maj. General Susumu Morioka for the campaign's operations around Lamon Bay, Luzon in December 1941.

The fleet arrived at Lamon Bay at 02:00 on 24 December 1941 and the landings were relatively uncontested.

Convoy duties 

The convoy was escorted by the destroyer ,  and minelayer . The convoy arrived safely at the Taichow Islands on 30 January 1942.

On 2 February 1942, Kaimei Maru departed Mako in a convoy to Haiphong, Vichy Indochina together with Durban Maru, Fuji Maru, Kayo Maru, Kofuku Maru, Lisbon Maru, Shinsei Maru and Ume Maru. The convoy was escorted by torpedo boat . While the convoy was exiting the harbor, Lisbon Maru struck a Japanese defensive mine resulting in the loss of 19 hands. Lisbon Maru was towed to a nearby island and beached.

Later in 1942, Kaimei Maru was sold to Tochigi Shoji K.K. of Wakamatsu-ku.

Sinking 

On 4 September 1942, United States Navy submarine , on her first patrol, attacked Kaimei Marus convoy at Kuji Bay off the northeastern coast of Honshu. At 16:40, the American submarine fired a torpedo which impacted the hold of Kaimei Maru. During the action, Guardfish also sank the cargo ship Tenryu Maru and the freighter Chita Maru. At the time of her sinking, Kaimei Maru was still owned by Tochigi Shoji KK of Wakamatsu-ku.

References 

1919 ships
Cargo ships
Maritime incidents in September 1942
Ships sunk by American submarines
Troop ships
World War II shipwrecks in the Pacific Ocean
Troop ships of Japan
Ships built in Hong Kong
Shipwrecks of Japan
Ships of the Imperial Japanese Army
World War II naval ships of Japan
Lamon Bay
Ships of Hong Kong
Auxiliary ships of the United Kingdom
Ships of Belgium
Ships of Panama
Ships built by the Hong Kong & Whampoa Dock Company